The 1994 Princeton Tigers football team was an American football team that represented Princeton University during the 1994 NCAA Division I-AA football season. Princeton tied for second place in the Ivy League.

In their eighth year under head coach Steve Tosches, the Tigers compiled a 7–3 record and outscored opponents 181 to 149. Mark Berkowitz and Carl Teter 
were the team captains.

Princeton's 4–3 conference record tied for second-best in the Ivy League standings. The Tigers outscored Ivy League opponents 133 to 117. 

Princeton played its home games at Palmer Stadium on the university campus in Princeton, New Jersey.

Schedule

References

Princeton
Princeton Tigers football seasons
Princeton Tigers football